Portland Township is a civil township of Ionia County in the U.S. state of Michigan. The population was 2,460 at the 2000 census.  The City of Portland is situated in the south central portion of the township, but is administratively autonomous.

Geography

Communities
Collins was an unincorporated community in Portland township.  It had a post office from 1871 until 1911.
Portland is a city located in the south central portion of Portland Township. As all cities in Michigan, it is administratively separate.

Demographics
As of the census of 2000, there were 2,460 people, 828 households, and 678 families residing in the township. The racial makeup of the township was 98.29% White, 0.41% Native American, 0.12% Asian, 0.65% from other races, and 0.53% from two or more races. Hispanic or Latino of any race were 1.91% of the population.

There were 828 households, out of which 43.0% had children under the age of 18 living with them, 72.8% were married couples living together, 5.3% had a female householder with no husband present, and 18.0% were non-families. 14.4% of all households were made up of individuals, and 5.0% had someone living alone who was 65 years of age or older.  The average household size was 2.97 and the average family size was 3.29.

In the township the population was spread out, with 30.9% under the age of 18, 7.6% from 18 to 24, 29.8% from 25 to 44, 25.0% from 45 to 64, and 6.6% who were 65 years of age or older.  The median age was 34 years. For every 100 females, there were 104.3 males.  For every 100 females age 18 and over, there were 102.0 males.

The median income for a household in the township was $59,700, and the median income for a family was $63,125. Males had a median income of $45,230 versus $29,784 for females. The per capita income for the township was $23,792.  About 3.9% of families and 3.6% of the population were below the poverty line, including 2.6% of those under age 18 and 8.9% of those age 65 or over.

References

Notes

Sources

Townships in Ionia County, Michigan
Grand Rapids metropolitan area
Townships in Michigan